Ruben Bemelmans and Philipp Petzschner were the defending champions but chose not to defend their title.

Julian Knowle and Jürgen Melzer won the title after defeating Sander Arends and Wesley Koolhof 7–6(7–4), 7–6(7–4) in the final.

Seeds

Draw

References
 Main Draw

Ethias Trophy - Doubles
2016 Ethias Trophy